Royal Garden Hotel is a 5-star hotel in London, England, located in the borough of Kensington.

History

The Royal Palace Hotel 
The hotel was preceded by the former Royal Palace Hotel, a Victorian-era hotel completed in 1893 designed by British architect, Basil Champneys. As part of the war effort in the 1900s, The Royal Palace was taken over and used as the headquarters for the Woman's Royal Voluntary Service.

Demolition and rebuilding 
In the 1961, as part of a Labour Government grant, the Queen Anne-style building was demolished and completely rebuilt in a Brutalist-style under the guide of architect, Colonel Richard Seifert. The hotel re-opened in 1965 as the Royal Garden Hotel, operated by the Oddeninos hotel company.

Later history 

In 1994, the hotel was bought by the Singaporean entrepreneur, Tan Sri Khoo Teck Puat, and undertook a £30 million refurbishment. It reopened in April 1996 under the management of Khoo's Goodwood Group, joining the group's two Singapore hotels, the Goodwood Park Hotel and the York Hotel.

In May 2011, the hotel completed the final stage of an extensive £45 million refurbishment.

The hotel closed in 2020, with plans and reopened in 2022 following the refurbishment of rooms and a restaurant.

References

External links
Official site

Hotels in London